Stephen or Steven Adams may refer to:

 Stephen Adams (composer) or  Michael Maybrick (1841–1913), English composer
 Stephen Adams (business) (born 1937), American businessman and private equity investor
 Stephen Adams (cricketer) (born 1953), New Zealand cricketer 
 Stephen Adams (footballer) (born 1989), Ghanaian footballer
 Stephen Adams (politician) (1807–1857), U.S. Representative and Senator from Mississippi
 Steven Adams (born 1993), New Zealand basketball player
 Steven Adams (musician), British musician

See also
 Steve Adams (disambiguation)
 Stephen Adam (disambiguation)